Nototorchus is a genus of beetles.

Placement
Nototorchus is uncontroversially placed in the tribe Osoriini of the subfamily Osoriinae.

Distribution
Nototorchus is endemic to New Zealand.

References

 McColl, H.P. 1982: Osoriinae (Insecta: Coleoptera: Staphylinidae). Fauna of New Zealand, (2) Extract and PDF [See p. 27; as Nototrochus; description]

External links
 iNaturalist

Staphylinidae genera
Osoriinae